Territorial Assembly elections were held in Chad on 30 March 1952. The result was a victory for Gaullist parties, with the Rally of the French People winning all 15 seats in the First College and the Chadian Democratic Union winning 24 of the 30 seats in the Second College.

Electoral system
The 45-seat Territorial Assembly had 15 seats elected by the first college in two constituencies, and 30 seats elected by the second college in ten constituencies.

Results

References

Chad
Elections in Chad
1952 in Chad
March 1952 events in Africa